Min Aung Myat (also Saw Aung Myat) was the chief queen consort of King Naratheinkha, and the Queen of the Southern Palace of King Sithu II of the Pagan Dynasty of Myanmar (Burma). King Sithu I and Queen Khin U were her maternal grandparents. Naratheinkha and Sithu II were her second cousins. She and Naratheinkha were married by their grandfather king. She had a daughter Saw Pyei Chantha with Naratheinkha but their child died in early 1170s during the reign of Naratheinkha.

She became a queen of her brother-in-law Sithu II in 1174 when Sithu II overthrew Naratheinkha. She retained the title Taung Pyinthe ("Queen of the Southern Palace") but was no longer the chief queen. (Weluwaddy was the chief queen who partook in the coronation ceremony.) According to the chronicle Yazawin Thit, no extant records say she had any children with Sithu II, and seemed to have died around the same time or right before as Weluwaddy since a new queen was raised to the rank of Taung Pyinthe, right after Weluwaddy's death in 1186.

References

Bibliography
 
 
 

Chief queens consort of Pagan
Queens consort of Pagan
12th-century Burmese women